This is a list of various northernmost things on earth.

Cities and settlements

Geography

Nature

Wild animals

Plants
These lists only contain naturally occurring plants and trees, excluding individuals planted by humans.

General

Shrubs

Trees

Education

Science and technology

Historical sites and archaeological findings

Recreation

General

Culture and music

Sport

Religious structures

Monasteries, religious orders and institutions

Transportation

Shops and service facilities

General

Famous brand names

Car brands

Fast food restaurants

Restaurants

Factories

Food and drinks

Farming

Gardens, zoos and aquaria

International organizations

Buildings and landmarks

Other 
Note: A lot of info on this section is inaccurate. Pending fix

See also

List of southernmost items
Extreme points of Earth
Extreme points of the Arctic
List of countries by northernmost point

Notes

References

Physical geography
Geography of the Arctic
Lists of extreme points
Geography-related lists of superlatives